The Ligas Provinciales del Peru are the Peruvian football lower divisions. They are administered by the Local Federations. The level immediately above is the Ligas Departamentales (Copa Perú).

The following is a list of provincial football leagues in Peru sorted by region.

Amazonas
 Liga Provincial de Bagua
 Liga Provincial de Bongará
 Liga Provincial de Condorcanqui
 Liga Provincial de Luya
 Liga Provincial de Rodríguez de Mendoza
 Liga Provincial de Utcubamba

Liga Provincial de Chachapoyas

Ancash
 Liga Provincial de Aija
 Liga Provincial de Bolognesi
 Liga Provincial de Carhuaz
 Liga Provincial de Casma
 Liga Provincial de Corongo
 Liga Provincial de Huari
 Liga Provincial de Huarmey
 Liga Provincial de Huaylas
 Liga Provincial de Mariscal Luzuriaga
 Liga Provincial de Ocros
 Liga Provincial de Recuay
 Liga Provincial de Sihuas
 Liga Provincial de Yungay

Liga Provincial de Huaraz

Liga Provincial de Santa

Apurímac

Liga Provincial de Abancay

Liga Provincial de Antabamba

Liga Provincial de Andahuaylas

Liga Provincial de Aymaraes

Liga Provincial de Cotabambas

Liga Provincial de Chincheros (Cusco Province)

Liga Provincial de Grau

Arequipa
 Liga Provincial de La Unión

Liga Provincial de Arequipa

Liga Provincial de Camaná

Liga Provincial de Caravelí

Liga Provincial de Castilla

Liga Provincial de Caylloma

Liga Provincial de Condesuyos

Liga Provincial de Islay

Ayacucho
 Liga Provincial de Cangallo
 Liga Provincial de Churcampa
 Liga Provincial de Huanca Sancos
 Liga Provincial de La Mar
 Liga Provincial de Vilcas Huamán

Liga Provincial del Huanta

Liga Provincial del Huamanga

Cajamarca
 Liga Provincial de Cajabamba
 Liga Provincial de Celendín
 Liga Provincial de Chota
 Liga Provincial de Contumazá
 Liga Provincial de Hualgayoc
 Liga Provincial de Jaén
 Liga Provincial de San Ignacio
 Liga Provincial de San Marcos
 Liga Provincial de San Miguel de Pallaques
 Liga Provincial de San Pablo
 Liga Provincial de Santa Cruz de Succhubamba

Liga Provincial del Cajamarca

Liga Provincial del Cutervo

Cusco
 Liga Provincial de Acomayo
 Liga Provincial de Anta
 Liga Provincial de Calca
 Liga Provincial de Canas
 Liga Provincial de Canchis
 Liga Provincial de Chumbivilcas
 Liga Provincial de La Convención
 Liga Provincial de Paruro
 Liga Provincial de Paucartambo
 Liga Provincial de Quispicanchi
 Liga Provincial de Urubamba

Liga Provincial del Cusco

Liga Provincial de Espinar

Huancavelica
 Liga Provincial de Castrovirreyna
 Liga Provincial de Huaytará

Liga Provincial de Acobamba

Liga Provincial de Angaraes

Liga Provincial de Huancavelica

Huánuco
 Liga Provincial de Ambo
 Liga Provincial de Dos de Mayo
 Liga Provincial de Huacaybamba
 Liga Provincial de Huamalíes
 Liga Provincial de Lauricocha
 Liga Provincial de Tocache (San Martín province)
 Liga Provincial de Yarowilca

Liga Provincial de Huánuco

Ica

Liga Provincial de Chincha

Liga Provincial de Ica

Liga Provincial de Nasca

Liga Provincial de Lucanas - Parinacochas (Ayacucho Province)

Liga Provincial de Palpa

Liga Provincial de Pisco

Junín
 Liga Provincial de Chanchamayo
 Liga Provincial de Chupaca
 Liga Provincial de Concepción
 Liga Provincial de Jauja
 Liga Provincial de Junín
 Liga Provincial de Tayacaja
 Liga Provincial de Yauli

Liga Provincial de Huancayo

Liga Provincial de Satipo

Liga Provincial de Tarma

La Libertad

Liga Provincial de Ascope

Liga Provincial de Chepén

Liga Provincial de Gran Chimú

Liga Provincial de Otuzco

Liga Provincial de Pacasmayo

Liga Provincial de Pataz

Liga Provincial de Santiago de Chuco

Liga Provincial de Sánchez Carrión

Liga Provincial de Trujillo

Liga Provincial de Virú

Lambayeque

Liga Provincial de Chiclayo

Liga Provincial de Ferreñafe

Liga Provincial de Lambayeque

Lima
 Liga Provincial de Oyón
 Liga Provincial de Yauyos

Liga Provincial de Lima (Interligas de Lima)

Liga Provincial de Barranca

Liga Provincial de Cañete

Liga Provincial de Canta

Liga Provincial de Huaral

Liga Provincial de Huarochirí

Liga Provincial de Huaura

Loreto
 Liga Provincial de Alto Amazonas
 Liga Provincial de Datem del Marañón
 Liga Provincial de Mariscal Ramón Castilla
 Liga Provincial de Requena
 Liga Provincial de Ucayali

Liga Provincial de Loreto

Liga Provincial de Maynas

Madre de Dios

Liga Provincial de Manu

Liga Provincial de Tahuamanu

Liga Provincial de Tambopata

Moquegua

Liga Provincial de General Sánchez Cerro

Liga Provincial de Ilo

Liga Provincial de Mariscal Nieto

Pasco

Liga Provincial de Daniel Alcídes Carrión

Liga Provincial de Oxapampa

Liga Provincial de Pasco

Piura

Liga Provincial de Ayabaca

Liga Provincial de Huancabamba

Liga Provincial de Morropón

Liga Provincial de Paita

Liga Provincial de Piura

Liga Provincial de Sechura

Liga Provincial de Sullana

Liga Provincial de Talara

Puno

Liga Provincial de Azángaro

Liga Provincial de Carabaya

Liga Provincial de Chucuito

Liga Provincial de El Collao

Liga Interprovincial de Huancané - Moho

Liga Interprovincial de El Collao - Chucuito

Liga Interprovincial de El Collao - Yunguyo

Liga Provincial de Huancané

Liga Provincial de Lampa

Liga Provincial de Melgar

Liga Provincial de Moho

Liga Provincial de Puno

Liga Provincial de San Antonio de Putina

Liga Provincial de Sandia

Liga Provincial de San Román

Liga Provincial de Yunguyo

San Martín

Liga Provincial de Bellavista

Liga Provincial de El Dorado

Liga Provincial de Huallaga

Liga Provincial de Lamas

Liga Provincial de Mariscal Cáceres

Liga Provincial de Moyobamba

Liga Provincial de Picota

Liga Provincial de Rioja

Liga Provincial de San Martín

Tacna

Liga Provincial de Candarave

Liga Provincial de Jorge Basadre

Liga Provincial de Tacna

Liga Provincial de Tarata

Tumbes

Liga Provincial de Contralmirante Villar

Liga Provincial de Tumbes

Liga Provincial de Zarumilla

Ucayali

Liga Provincial de Atalaya

Liga Provincial de Coronel Portillo

Liga Provincial de Padre Abad

Liga Provincial de Puerto Inca (Huánuco Province)

Liga Provincial de Purús

External links
 Peruvian Football Federation
 RSSSF

6